Schindleria brevipinguis is a species of marine fish in family Gobiidae of Perciformes. Known as the stout infantfish, it is native to Australia's Great Barrier Reef and to Osprey Reef in the Coral Sea.

Anatomy
S. brevipinguis is among the smallest known fish in the world, together with species such as Paedocypris progenetica. S. brevipinguis is distinguished from the similar S. praematura by having its first anal-fin ray further forward, under dorsal-fin 4, rather than 7–11 in S. praematura. Like most closely related fishes, the fish is very thin, and one specimen weighed just 0.7 milligrams.

Taxonomy
The specific epithet, brevipinguis, derives from the Latin brevis (short) and pinguis (stout), in reference to the fish's shorter, thicker body, as compared with other Schindleria species.

The first specimen was collected by Jeff Leis in 1979, but the species was not formally described until a 2004 paper (Watson and Walker).

References

 McGrouther, M., J. Leis, T. Trnski. "Stout Infantfish, Schindleria brevipinguis". Fishes: Australian Museum Fish Site. July 2004.
 Picture of Stout Infantfish

External links
"Bragging Rights: The Smallest Fish Ever"
Some records in the fish world

Schindleriidae
Gobiidae
Fish described in 2004